Kelvin Grove or Kelvingrove may refer to:
 Kelvin Grove, Calgary, a neighbourhood of Calgary, Alberta, Canada
 Kelvin Grove, Queensland, a suburb of Brisbane, Queensland, Australia
 Kelvin Grove, Palmerston North, a suburb of Palmerston North, New Zealand
 Glasgow Kelvingrove (UK Parliament constituency)
 Kelvingrove Art Gallery and Museum, Glasgow, Scotland
 Kelvingrove Park, Glasgow, Scotland
 Kelvingrove, Glasgow, an area of Glasgow, Scotland